Steinar Sulheim (1815–1856) was a Norwegian farmer and mountain tourism pioneer. He is known for the first recorded ascent of Galdhøpiggen in 1850.

He was also one of the first people in Norway to commercialise mountain hiking and guided tours of the region. 

Sulheim had a farm in Bøverdalen, called Sulheim.  (Thereby his name) He  was also the owner of the mountain farm Spiterstulen in Visdalen, where he built an annex for providing lodging for visitors to Jotunheimen.

References

1815 births
1856 deaths
People from Lom, Norway
Norwegian farmers
Norwegian mountain climbers
Galdhøpiggen
Sportspeople from Innlandet